José Amaro (13 January 1954 – 7 May 1987) was a Portuguese racing cyclist. He rode in the 1975 Tour de France.

References

1954 births
1987 deaths
Portuguese male cyclists
Place of birth missing